Madbun (also Romanized as Madbūn; also known as Madban and Madyoon) is a village in Hotkan Rural District, in the Central District of Zarand County, Kerman Province, Iran. At the 2006 census, its population was 84, in 29 families.

References 

Populated places in Zarand County